Piedimonte may refer to several places of Italy:

Piedimonte Etneo, a municipality in the Province of Catania, Sicily.
Piedimonte Matese, a municipality in the Province of Caserta, Campania.
Piedimonte San Germano, a municipality in the Province of Frosinone, Lazio.

Other uses
Piedimonte bianco, another name for the Campanian wine grape Pallagrello bianco

See also
Piedmont, a region of northern Italy